was a Lieutenant-General in the Imperial Japanese Army, who commanded the Japanese Seventeenth Area Army in Korea from April 1945 until the end of World War II.

Life
Yoshio Kozuki became an infantry officer in 1909 and was a language officer in Germany. He served in several positions, until August 1940 when he became commander of the IJA 19th Division, based in Korea.  

On July 4 1942 he was appointed Commander of the 2nd Army based in Manchukuo until May 28 1943, when he took over the command of the Mongolia Garrison Army. In November 1944, he became Commander of the 11th Army and in April 1945 of the Seventeenth Area Army in Korea, which was demobilized in August 1945 without having seen combat. 

After the war, he was Vice-minister of demobilization and in 1947 Head of the Demobilization Bureau, which fell under the Ministry of Health and Welfare.

References
 Generals.dk
 The Pacific War Online Encyclopedia

1886 births
1971 deaths
Imperial Japanese Army generals of World War II
Military personnel from Kumamoto Prefecture
People from Kumamoto
Japanese generals
Japanese military personnel of World War II